= Diamitosa =

Scientific classification
- Kingdom: Animalia
- Phylum: Arthropoda
- Class: Insecta
- Order: Coleoptera
- Suborder: Polyphaga
- Infraorder: Cucujiformia
- Family: Cerambycidae
- Genus: Diamitosa
- Species: D. moseri

Binomial name
- Diamitosa moseri Kriesche, 1927

Species of beetle

Diamitosa moseri is a species of beetle in the family Cerambycidae, and the only species in the genus Diamitosa. It was described by Kriesche in 1927.
